Copelatus parallelus is a species of diving beetle. It is part of the genus Copelatus in the subfamily Copelatinae of the family Dytiscidae. It was described by Zimmerman in 1920.

References

parallelus
Beetles described in 1920